Felix Mikhailovich Sobolev (1931–1984) was a Soviet Ukrainian documentary filmmaker and a founder and leader of the Kiev School of Scientific Cinema.  He received numerous honours for his works, including Honored Artist of the Ukrainian SSR, the MV Lomonosov Prize of the Academy of Sciences of the Soviet Union and the USSR State Prize.

Biography

Felix Sobolev was born on 25 July 1931 in Kharkiv, Ukraine SSR, the son of a worker. He enrolled at the Kyiv National I. K. Karpenko-Kary Theatre, Cinema and Television University and graduated from the acting program in 1953 and the directing program in 1959.

In 1959, Sobolev began working for Kievnauchfilm ( the Kyiv Film Studio of Popular Science Films), a state film studio in Kyiv. In 1973, he became artistic director of the studio of scientific cinema at his alma mater.

He was a member of the Union of Cinematographers of the USSR from 1956.

Sobolev died on 20 April 1984 in Kyiv.

Influence

In the mid-1960s, Sobolev revolutionized the concept of popular science cinematography. His "experiment in the frame" technique made the audience member a witness to experiments proposed by scientists. By the 1970s, Sobolev became disillusioned with the physical sciences, according to his student Alexander Rodnyansky, and began to make films about psychology. Radical for its time, his 1971 film  made the audience part of an experiment on conformal behaviour and group pressure.

The direction of his work changed with the 1974 short film , a film essay about the world and a person's place in it. This was followed by the 10-minute film Feat which was shot in close quarters. Both films made intensive use of combined filming and had significant impact on the development of non-fiction films of the time.

Sobolev also influenced a generation of students at the Institute of Theatre Arts and young directors at Kievnauchfilm, where he was the undisputed leader. These included Rodnyansky, Yosif Pasternak, and Andrei Zagdansky.

In Cinema Art, Sergey Trimbach writes that Sobolev was at the center of one of the two great film movements in Kyiv in the 1960s and 1970s. The other circle was led by Armenian filmmaker Sergei Parajanov, who was censured as his cinematic style opposed Soviet principles. In contrast, Sobolev continued the tradition of Russian intelligentsia, believing in the endless potential of human capabilities, as in his 1978 film Dare, you are talented. Yet he was not politically motivated, basing Exploded Dawn on the work of a dissident and taking political risks by examining conformity and free thought in Me and Others. Sobolev came into conflict with the party committee over Kyiv Symphony (1982), the last film he completed, which was re-edited seven times to meet political demands and left Sobolev angry and with a damaged reputation.

Filmography

Sobolev's notable film works include:

Awards and honours

Legacy 
F. Sobolev Street in Kyiv was named for him, with a memorial plaque at 17 Franka Street.  Another memorial plaque at 19  in Kyiv states: Here during the years 1964–1981 one of the geniuses of Ukrainian and world cinema Felix Sobolev (1931–1984) lived and worked here.

The Kievnauchfilm charitable foundation is named for Sobolev. Asteroid 5940 Feliksobolev, discovered in 1981, was named for him.

Sobolev is the subject of the nine-part 1998 documentary series Felix Sobolev, Mission Interrupted (Ukrainian «Фелікс Соболев. Увірвана місія») by his student and colleague Olender and of a film of the 2012 "Native People" series by Yulia Rudenko.

References

Citations

General references
 Фурманова 3. Шаги за горизонт: Фильмы о науке кинорежиссера Феликса Соболева. [Steps beyond the horizon: Films about the science of film director Felix Sobolev] М., 1987;
 Митці України. [Artists of Ukraine] К., 1992. — С.540;
 Мистецтво України: Біографічний довідник. [Art of Ukraine: Biographical reference book] К., 1997. — С.550;
 Фурманова 3. Колосяйво Фелікса Соболева // Кіноколо. [Felix Sobolev's Colossus] 1997. № 1. — С.68—69;
 УСЕ: Універсальний словник-енциклопедія. [Universal dictionary-encyclopedia] К., 1999. — С.1257.

External links

 Interview with F. Sobolev, "Cinema Art". No. 9, 1971; No. 4, 1975; No. 2, 1982.

1931 births
1984 deaths
Ukrainian documentary filmmakers
Soviet filmmakers
Recipients of the USSR State Prize